Hinde (or Hynde) is an English surname. Notable persons with that surname include:

 Charles T. Hinde (1832–1915), American businessman
 Chrissie Hynde (born 1951), American musician
 Edmund C. Hinde (1830–1909), American gold miner and laborer
 Frank Hinde (1869–1931), Irish-English cricketer
 Gregory Hinde, American composer
 George Jennings Hinde (1839–1918), British geologist and paleontologist
 Harold Hinde (1895–1965), English cricketer
 Harry Hinde (1865–1942), American businessman, inventor and politician
 Hildegarde Beatrice Hinde (1871–1959), English writer and linguist 
 Joan Hinde (1933–2015), British trumpeter and entertainer
 John Hinde (disambiguation), various people
 John Hynde (before 1517–1550), English judge
 Katie Hinde, American Associate Professor of Evolutionary Biology
 Robert Hinde (1923–2016), English professor of zoology
 Sidney Langford Hinde (1863–1930), British military physician and author
 Thomas Hinde (disambiguation), several persons
 Tony Hussein Hinde (1953–2008), Maldivian surfer
 William Hinde (1900–1981), British polo player
 William Hinde (soldier), British Army officer in WWII

See also
Hind (disambiguation)
Hinds (surname)

Surnames from nicknames